Dumitru Ivanov (born 6 November 1946) is a Romanian rower. He competed in the men's coxless four event at the 1968 Summer Olympics.

References

1946 births
Living people
Romanian male rowers
Olympic rowers of Romania
Rowers at the 1968 Summer Olympics
People from Suceava County